Martin Luther King Jr. station is an underground light rail station on the K Line of the Los Angeles Metro Rail system. It is located underneath Crenshaw Boulevard at its intersection with Martin Luther King Jr. Boulevard, after which the station is named, in the Los Angeles neighborhoods of Baldwin Hills and Leimert Park. The station’s main entrance is next to the iconic Baldwin Hills Crenshaw Plaza shopping mall.

The station opened on October 7, 2022.

The station incorporates artwork by three artists: Mara Lonner, Shinique Smith, and Eileen Cowin.

Service

Station layout

Hours and frequency

Connections 
, the following connections are available:
LADOT DASH: Crenshaw, Leimert/Slauson, Midtown

Notable places nearby 
The station is within walking distance of the following notable places:
Baldwin Hills Crenshaw Plaza
Marlton Square

References

K Line (Los Angeles Metro) stations
Crenshaw, Los Angeles
Public transportation in California
Railway stations in the United States opened in 2022